M. lepidus may refer to:
 Misumenops lepidus, a spider species in the genus Misumenops
 Mycetoporus lepidus, a beetle species in the genus Mycetoporus

See also
 Lepidus (disambiguation)